SA Ambulance Service (SAAS) is a State Government agency under SA Health, that provides emergency ambulance transport, clinical care and non emergency patient transport services to over 1.5 million people, distributed across an area of 1,043,514 square kilometres in South Australia, Australia.

The service employs approximately 1600 people, and utilizes 1400 volunteers, working out of 105 locations, operating 385 ambulance vehicles to provide emergency, non-emergency, aeromedical, rescue and retrieval services across the entire state.

History
In 1949 the metropolitan area was served by:
 SA Ambulance Transport Inc. (originally Hindmarsh Volunteer Ambulance formed in 1921), seven vehicles based at Hindmarsh, Unley (from March 1931 on behalf of Unley City Council) and Port Adelaide (started in July 1922 as Port Adelaide Citizen's Ambulance)
 Civil Ambulance (Police Department) two vehicles based at Angas St, Adelaide
 Northern Suburbs Ambulance Association, one vehicle based at Prospect since 1 January 1947
 Joe Myren's Private Ambulance, one vehicle based at Glen Osmond Road, Parkside since June 1927

In a ceremony at the St. John Ambulance Brigade annual review on Sunday 21 September 1952 metropolitan ambulance services in Adelaide (and later the country services) were formally merged to run by the St. John Council for South Australia Inc. which was part of St John Ambulance until 1993. Joe Myren's Private Ambulance was not merged immediately and continued to run independently until 1955 when the business and vehicle were sold to St. John for £500.

Through to the 1980s, the ambulance service in metropolitan Adelaide was staffed by volunteers at nights and weekends. After a series of industrial disputes from 1977 and parliamentary enquiries through the 1980s the service moved to a fully paid service in the metropolitan area by 1991 as well as major country centres, representing a huge shift in public opinion from the strong support of volunteerism in 1979.

SAAS came into being in 1993 as a result of the Ambulance Services Act 1992 which formed an association S.A. St. John Ambulance Service Inc as a joint venture between the Minister of Health and Priory in Australia of the Grand Priory of the Most Venerable Order of the Hospital of St. John of Jerusalem. The name of the association was amended to SA Ambulance Service Inc in 2005 and in 2008, SAAS became an agency under the Minister of Health.

Organisation
SA Ambulance service is led by a CEO who is responsible to the South Australian Minister for Health and Wellbeing through the Department of Health and Wellbeing (SA Health).

 Chief Executive Officer (CEO)
 Chief Medical Officer Provides clinical direction and oversight to SA Ambulance.
 Executive Director, Operations (Metropolitan) is responsible for emergency and non-emergency Ambulance operations in the Adelaide Metropolitan area.
 Executive Director Operations (Country) is responsible for emergency and non-emergency Ambulance operations in regional and rural South Australia.
 Executive Director, Clinical Services 
 Executive Director State-wide Operational Services is responsible for the emergency operations centre, planning and resourcing, clinical hub, and operational systems.
 Executive Director, Strategy and Operational Reform 
 Executive Director Rescue, Retrieval and Aviation Services (RRAS) is responsible for special operations, rescue, retrieval and aviation operations.
 Director Clinical Services SAAS MedSTAR is responsible for MedSTAR which includes SA Ambulance's critical care medical retrievals and MedSTAR Kids
 Director Workforce is responsible for human resources, work place health and safety, industrial relations and workforce strategy and planning.
 Executive Director Corporate Services is responsible for financial services, business services, ICT, fleet services and records.

Ambulance types

SA Ambulance Service is known to operate a variety of emergency and non-emergency vehicles across the state, which travel in excess of 10 million kilometres each year. All vehicles have distinctive green and yellow livery, high visibility LED lightbars and warning lights and sirens. Most SAAS Ambulance vans feature custom SA license plates starting with 'AMB' and then the fleet number of the vehicles, for example, an Ambulance with the fleet number 277 has the license plate 'AMB·277'.

Emergency Ambulances

SA Ambulance Service operates 270 Mercedes-Benz Sprinter Ambulances for use in metropolitan and regional areas, and 10 Toyota Landcruiser 70 series Ambulances for use in rural and remote areas. All salaried emergency ambulance crews rostered within the Adelaide metropolitan area are skilled at least Paramedic level (3-year degree + 1-year internship) with numerous crews skilled at Intensive Care Paramedic level (3-year degree + 1-year internship + 2 years paramedic experience as a minimum + graduate diploma + an ICP internship). In rural areas of South Australia approximately 1,500 Ambulance volunteers crew emergency ambulances and community response vehicles (station wagons/4 wheel drives). SAAS Clinical Education unit (a Registered Training Organisation) trains volunteer Ambulance Assists & Ambulance Responders to Nationally accredited Certificate II in Medical Service First Response and Ambulance Officers to Certificate IV in Health Care Level. SAAS is the only emergency ambulance provider in South Australia.

Patient Transport Service
Mercedes Benz Sprinter Ambulances are used by both the Patient Transport Service (PTS) and Emergency Support Service (ESS) crews. PTS and ESS Ambulance Officers are trained via the SAAS Clinical Education unit (a Registered Training Organisation) To the Nationally Accredited Certificate IV in Health Care qualification.

Extended Care Paramedics
SAAS also operate a team of Extended Care Paramedics, who operate from Mercedes Valente vans. Unlike regular paramedics, ECPs are able to treat patients for common medical issues, and refer to other health providers such as GPs if needed, reducing the need to transport patients to hospital emergency departments unnecessarily.

SPRINT (Single Paramedic Response and INTervention)
SPRINT Paramedics use Volkswagen Tiguan Allspace 162TSI vehicles for rapid response purposes within the Adelaide metropolitan area.

SPRINT Bicycles (BRU)
SPRINT paramedics also utilise bicycles at major events where heavy pedestrian traffic may reduce response times for larger vehicles. The crews may help guide ambulances through busy areas, and carry limited medical equipment including oxygen and a defibrillator.

Special operations and specialty 
The Special Operations Team use Toyota Landcruiser 4WD vehicles and a purpose-built Mercedes Sprinter rescue support vehicle when performing the SOT responder role. SA Ambulance has a Mercedes Benz Sprinter bariatric transport ambulance.

Management & Operational Command Vehicles
SAAS use a mix of Holden Trailblazer and Colorado vehicles for Team Leaders and Managers. An Isuzu 16-tonne Tactical Support Vehicle is used as a command vehicle for major incidents and planned events and an Iveco bus (AmBus) is used as a mass casualty Ambulance. SA Ambulance services also has Fuso Canter trucks for logistics.

Airwing
SAAS are the controlling authority for the five Babcock Rescue Helicopters (1 EC 130 and 4 Bell 412), for the use of roadside trauma response, medical retrievals, training exercises and SAPOL, CFS and SES operations. The Royal Flying Doctor Service operates a number of Pilatus PC12 aircraft performing inter-hospital transfers from regional area and first response ambulance service in remote areas.

Special Operations Team

Special Operations Team (SOT) rescue paramedics are trained in high-risk rescue procedures. They work closely with other emergency services and the South Australian Police STAR Group. SOT Paramedics also cycle through the MedSTAR retrieval service.

Communications
The SAAS Emergency Operations Centre (EOC), based in Eastwood, Adelaide, primarily answers emergency triple-zero (000) calls using the MPDS dispatch system. The EOC coordinates SA Ambulance Service resources. The EOC also coordinates the dispatch of the Motor Accident Commission Rescue Helicopter Service and MedSTAR Retrieval Service. Emergency medical dispatch support officers (EMDSO) coordinate calls from the Divers Emergency Service and the SA Trauma Service.

Communications between paramedics and the EOC is conducted primarily through Mobile Data Terminals and  SA GRN pagers and radios, but mobile phones may also be used in some circumstances.

See also
 Ambulance
 Paramedic
 000 Emergency

References

Further reading

External links
 Official Website
 Official YouTube channel

Ambulance services in Australia
Emergency services in South Australia
Government agencies of South Australia
Ambulance